The Bulgaria women's national under-19 volleyball team represents Bulgaria in international women's volleyball competitions and friendly matches under the age 19 and it is ruled by the Bulgarian Volleyball Federation That is an affiliate of Federation of International Volleyball FIVB and also a part of European Volleyball Confederation CEV.

History

Results

FIVB U19 World Championship
 Champions   Runners up   Third place   Fourth place

Europe U18 / U17 Championship
 Champions   Runners up   Third place   Fourth place

Team

Current squad

The following is the Bulgarian roster in the 2015 Girls' Youth European Volleyball Championship.

Head Coach:  Radoslav Bakardzhiev

See also
Bulgaria women's team
Bulgaria women's U18 team
Bulgaria women's U20 team
Bulgaria women's U23 team
Bulgaria men's team

References

External links
 Official website 

National women's under-18 volleyball teams
Volleyball
Volleyball in Bulgaria